Michael Lew Winkelman (June 27, 1946 – July 27, 1999) was an American film and television actor. He was perhaps best known for playing Little Luke in the television sitcom series The Real McCoys.

Winkelman was born in Los Angeles, California. His mother, grandmother and great-grandmother had all been stage performers. Winkelman began his screen career in 1955, appearing in the television series The Great Gildersleeve. He then co-starred in the new ABC sitcom The Real McCoys as Little Luke. While playing the role he also played in the North Hollywood Little League.

After the series ended in 1963, Winkelman guest-starred in television programs including The Munsters, Wagon Train, The Joey Bishop Show, Mickey Spillane's Mike Hammer, The Danny Thomas Show, The Lone Ranger, The Millionaire and Mr. Novak. He also appeared in films, such as The Big Knife, Bobby Ware Is Missing, Sincerely Yours, The Indian Fighter and Ride Out for Revenge. Winkelman died in July 1999 in Los Angeles, California, at the age of 53. He was buried in Riverside National Cemetery.

References

External links 

Rotten Tomatoes profile

1946 births
1999 deaths
People from Los Angeles
Male actors from Los Angeles
American male film actors
American male television actors
American male child actors
20th-century American male actors
Burials at Riverside National Cemetery